Maria Cristina Falls is a waterfall of the Agus River in the Northern Mindanao region of the Philippines. It is sometimes called the "twin falls" as the flow is separated by a rock at the brink of the waterfall. It is located 9.3 kilometers away southwest of Iligan City at the boundaries of Barangays Maria Cristina, Ditucalan, and Buru-un.

Agus VI hydroelectric plant
Maria Cristina Falls powers the Agus VI Hydroelectric Plant, one of the several hydroelectric plants that harness Agus River. The power plant has a 200 MW potential capacity supplied by a water flow of about 130 cubic meters per second.

Agus VI is operated by the National Power Corporation and was commissioned on May 31, 1953. Under President Gloria Macapagal Arroyo's Mindanao Super Region development plan, the Agus VI is planned to undergo a 1.856-billion-peso upgrading project.

References

External links

 Official Website of the Iligan City Government - Maria Cristina Falls

See also
List of waterfalls in Mindanao

Waterfalls of the Philippines
Landforms of Lanao del Norte
Tourist attractions in Iligan
Iligan